Simarouba glauca is a flowering tree that is native to Florida, South America, and the Caribbean. Common names include paradise-tree, dysentery-bark, bitterwood . The tree is well suited for warm, humid, tropical regions. Its cultivation depends on rainfall distribution, water holding capacity of the soil and sub-soil moisture. It bears yellow flowers and oval elongated purple colored fleshy fruits.

Cultivation
It can be propagated from seeds, grafting and tissue culture technology. Fruits are collected in the month of April / May, when they are ripe and then dried in sun for about a week. Skin is separated and seeds are grown in plastic bags to produce saplings. Saplings 2 to 3 months old can be transplanted to a plantation.

Use
The wood is generally insect resistant and is used in the preparation of quality furniture, toys, matches, as pulp (in paper making). It can be also used for industrial purposes in the manufacture of biofuel, soaps, detergents, lubricants, varnishes, cosmetics, and pharmaceuticals.

Claims of medicinal properties
Though there is some research claiming that Simarouba is effective for treating certain diseases, there seems to be insufficient evidence of curing diarrhea, malaria, edema, fever and stomach upset. Known in India as Lakshmi Taru, the extracts from parts of the tree have been claimed to possess potent  anticancer  properties. However, to date,  no systematic  research using phytochemicals isolated from Simarouba glauca has been carried out to explore the molecular mechanisms leading to cancer cell death. Simarouba extracts are known to be effective only on specific types of human cancer cell lines and tests conducted were invitro. Whether the same effect would be observed under invivo conditions, depends on bioavailability and bioaccessibility, hence Simarouba as an alternative cure for cancer remains unproven.

Environmental impact
The tree forms a well-developed root system and dense evergreen canopy that efficiently checks soil erosion, supports soil microbial life, and improves groundwater position. Besides converting solar energy into biochemical energy all round the year, it checks overheating of the soil surface all through the year and particularly during summer. Large-scale planting in wastelands facilitates wasteland reclamation, converts the accumulated atmospheric carbon dioxide into oxygen and contributes to the reduction of greenhouse effect or global warming.

See also 
 Bitter wood
 Quassia amara
 Picrasma excelsa

References

Simaroubaceae
Plants described in 1811
Trees of the Bahamas
Trees of Central America
Trees of the Southeastern United States
Trees of Haiti
Trees of the Dominican Republic
Trees of Puerto Rico
Trees of Cuba
Trees of Jamaica
Trees of Mexico